Gary Edward Schreider (April 21, 1934 – January 22, 2011) was a Canadian football player who played for the Hamilton Tiger-Cats, Ottawa Rough Riders and BC Lions. He won the Grey Cup with Ottawa in 1960. He played university football at Queen's University, where he was part of the Golden Gaels' 1955 Yates Cup championship.

During the 1965 off-season, Schreider became a founding member, and first president, of the Canadian Football League Players' Association.  He did not return to the CFL for the 1965 season, going on to a career as a lawyer and judge.

Schreider has been inducted into the Queen's University Hall of Fame and the Ottawa Sports Hall of Fame.

Schreider died in 2011 of pneumonia and Alzheimer's disease.

References

1934 births
Sportspeople from Belleville, Ontario
Players of Canadian football from Ontario
BC Lions players
Hamilton Tiger-Cats players
Ottawa Rough Riders players
2011 deaths
Queen's University at Kingston alumni
Queen's Golden Gaels football players